SK Sparta Krč is a football club from Prague, Czech Republic. It plays in the ninth level of Czech football.

In 2007–08, the club played in the Czech 2. Liga.

External links
  Official website

Football clubs in Prague
Association football clubs established in 1910